The Year of the Hare is a 1975 picaresque novel by Finnish author Arto Paasilinna. It tells the story of Kaarlo Vatanen, a frustrated journalist, who, after nearly killing a hare with his car, turns away from an unhappy and unwholesome life. On an impulse, Vatanen abruptly abandons his urban lifestyle, job, and wife, in exchange for the freedom of the road and the wilderness, living off his cash savings and casual employment, all the time accompanied by the hare which he has nursed back to health and kept as a pet. A year of unlikely encounters and adventures ensues, during the course of which Vatanen repeatedly runs afoul of the law and conventional mores but manages to stay afloat thanks to the help and understanding of other sympathetic free spirits.

The novel has been translated into 29 languages including English, Bulgarian, Chinese, Croatian, Czech, Dutch, Estonian, French, German, Hebrew, Hungarian, Italian, Japanese, Korean, Rumanian, Russian, Swedish, Slovenian, Turkish, and Ukrainian <sks.fi 21.11.2018>. It is Paasilinna's most widely read work and was included in 1994 in the UNESCO Collection of Representative Works which funded the 1995 English translation by Herbert Lomas. It was adapted twice into feature films: a 1977 Finnish film called The Year of the Hare, and a 2006 French film directed by Marc Rivière called Le Lièvre de Vatanen.

Notes

References
 Arto Paasilinna, Herbert Lomas (tr.). The Year of the Hare.  (1995, 1st ed.).  (2006, 6th ed.)

External links
Reviews
 The Year of the Hare at The New York Times
 The Year of the Hare at World Literature Today (via Article Archives, JavaScript required)
 The Year of the Hare at complete review
 The Year of the Hare at The Literary Traveller

1975 novels
20th-century Finnish novels
Finnish comedy novels
Satirical novels
Picaresque novels
Finnish novels adapted into films
Books about rabbits and hares
Novels set in Finland
Novels by Arto Paasilinna